Jeffrey R. Beard is an American manager. He was appointed to become director-general of the International Baccalaureate (IB), based in Geneva, Switzerland, starting on January 1, 2006, following the retirement of the previous director-general, George Walker.

Beard was born in Akron, Ohio in 1950 and attended Ellet High School. He then went on to study at the US Naval Academy, graduating in 1972 with a Bachelor of Science degree in Analytical Management. He also holds an MBA from the University of Wisconsin–Oshkosh and an MS from Iowa State University. Most recently, Beard worked as division president and Chief Operating Officer Seeds for Syngenta AG, a Swiss agribusiness based in Basel. He has also served as an officer in the US Navy (Groton, CT; Brawdy, Wales, UK) and worked for Procter and Gamble (paper products: Mehoopany, PA; Green Bay, WI) and Pioneer Hi-Bred, Int'l (Johnston, IA, USA; Paris, France; Parndorf, Austria).

Beard gave a speech at Chautauqua Institution in August 2010 on reforming education. Chautauqua Institution officials later discovered the speech was not Beard's original work, as it drew heavily upon a speech given earlier in the year by Sir Ken Robinson at a TED conference. According to a letter printed in the Chautauquan Daily, Beard used "identical quotes, phrasing and even anecdotes." The Institution issued an apology to those who attended the talk, saying "Beard's behavior in this matter is not characteristic of the work done here at Chautauqua and violates the expectations you should have for that work. We acknowledge to you our genuine disappointment in this event." Beard's explanation was that he had not intended to pass off the work he quoted as his own, but acknowledged that he could and should have made it more obvious that he was citing the work of others, most particularly Sir Ken Robinson, whom he admires greatly and quotes frequently. Staff at the IBO were surprised by the incident, as Beard is generally well-regarded and known for his honesty and integrity throughout his life and career.

After his term at IB, Beard was hired in 2014 by GEMS Education to lead the development and innovation of its education programmes. He also provides academic consultancy services.

Beard has been married since 1972 to wife Cecily, and has 2 children: Lindsay (born in 1977 in Haverfordwest, Wales, UK) and Andrew (born 1980 in Pennsylvania).  Both Lindsay and Andrew completed the International Baccalaureate program at the Vienna International School in the 1990s.  Lindsay now lives in Wales with her 4 children and is an executive manager.  Andrew (who also attended the US Naval Academy) is a LTCDR in the US Navy, and a qualified pilot and lives in Virginia with his wife and 2 children.

References

External links
https://web.archive.org/web/20101124223157/http://ibo.org/dg/

International Baccalaureate
Living people
Year of birth missing (living people)
United States Naval Academy alumni
American chief operating officers
University of Wisconsin–Oshkosh alumni